Zovax whiteheadii is a moth in the family Crambidae. It was described by Edith Wollaston in 1879. It is found on Saint Helena.

References

Crambinae
Moths described in 1879